Mengaka (Məgaka), or Mengaka Bamileke, is a Bamileke language of Cameroon. It was written in an indigenous script called Bagam.

References

Languages of Cameroon
Bamileke languages